Laura Pugh (born 1 November 1993) is an Australian rules footballer playing for the Fremantle Football Club in the AFL Women's (AFLW). Pugh was drafted by Fremantle with their sixth selection and fifty-ninth overall in the 2018 AFL Women's draft. She made her debut in the four point win against  at Casey Fields in the opening round of the 2019 season.

References

External links 

1993 births
Living people
Fremantle Football Club (AFLW) players
Australian rules footballers from Western Australia